Camerino Cathedral (Cattedrale di Santa Maria Annunziata) is a Neoclassical Roman Catholic cathedral and minor basilica, dedicated to the Annunciation, in Camerino, Region of Marche, Italy. Since 1987 it has been the seat of the Archbishop of Camerino-San Severino Marche, having been the seat of the Archbishops of Camerino from 1787 and previously that of the Bishops of Camerino.

History
The present church was built in 1802-1832 based on designs by Andrea Vici and Clemente Folchi. It was erected on the site of the previous medieval Romanesque-Gothic cathedral, destroyed in the 1799 earthquake.

The sacristy still houses works such as a 13th-century painted crucifix, a 15th-century icon of the 
Madonna della Misericordia, and other paintings. The church once housed a large polyptych by Carlo Crivelli, which was disassembled and sold: the central panel is now in the Pinacoteca di Brera in Milan. One of the chapels once contained frescoes, now lost, by Andrea Sacchi.

The crypt has two 14th-century lions sculpted by Armanno da Pioraco, a bust of Cardinal Angelo Giori and his brother Prospero by followers of Bernini, and a marble 14th- or 15th-century coffin holding the relics of Saint Ansovinus (a 9th-century bishop of Camerino).

The cathedral was declared a minor basilica in 1970.

References

19th-century Roman Catholic church buildings in Italy
Minor basilicas in Marche
Roman Catholic cathedrals in Italy
Roman Catholic churches in Camerino
Roman Catholic churches completed in 1832
Cathedrals in the Marche